The 2015 Blackpool Borough Council election took place on 7 May 2015 to elect members of Blackpool Borough Council in England. All 21 wards of 2 seats each on the council were contested with newly elected members next due to serve a four-year term and next contest their seats in 2019. This election took place on the same day as other local elections as well as the 2015 UK General Election.

The Labour Party retained an overall control on the council, winning 29 of the 42 seats on the council. The Conservative Party won the remaining 13 seats, wiping out the Liberal Democrats.

Result

A total of 107,097 votes were cast, with 345 ballots being spoilt. The turnout was 58.1%.

Council Composition
Prior to the election the composition of the council was:

After the election, the composition of the council was:

Lib Dem - Liberal Democrats

Ward Results
Asterisks denote incumbent Councillors seeking re-election. All results are listed below:

Anchorsholme

Bispham

Bloomfield

Brunswick

Claremont

Clifton

Greenlands

Hawes Side

Highfield

Ingthorpe

Layton

Marton

Cllr Elmes previously stood as a candidate in 2011 but was not elected.

Norbeck

Park

Squires Gate

Stanley

Talbot

Tyldesley

Victoria

Warbeck

Waterloo

References

2015 English local elections
May 2015 events in the United Kingdom
2015
2010s in Lancashire